The Parliament House in New Delhi is the seat of the Parliament of India. Its houses the Lok Sabha and the Rajya Sabha which represent lower and upper houses respectively in India's bicameral parliament.

At a distance of 750 meters from the Rashtrapati Bhavan, it is located on Sansad Marg which crosses the Central Vista and is surrounded by the Vijay Chowk, India Gate(All India War Memorial), National War Memorial (India), Vice President's House, Hyderabad House, Secretariat Building, Prime minister's office and residence, ministerial buildings and other administrative units of Indian government.

The building was designed by the British architects Edwin Lutyens and Herbert Baker and was constructed between 1921 and 1927. It was opened in January 1927 as the seat of the Imperial Legislative Council. Following the end of British rule in India, it was taken over by the Constituent Assembly, and then by the Indian Parliament once India's Constitution came into force in 1950.

A new building to house Parliament is under construction directly opposite the current building as part of the Indian government's Central Vista Redevelopment Project.

History 

Originally called the House of Parliament, it was designed by the British architects Edwin Lutyens and Herbert Baker in 1912-1913 as part of their wider mandate to construct a new administrative capital city for  India. Construction of the Parliament House began in 1921 and it was completed in 1927.

The foundation stone was laid by HRH Prince Arthur, Duke of Connaught and Strathearn, in February 1921. It took five years to complete the building. On 18 January 1927, Sir Bhupendra Nath Mitra, Member of the Governor-General's Executive Council, in charge of the Department of Industries and Labour, invited Lord Irwin Viceroy of India to open the building. The third session of Central Legislative Assembly was held in this house on 19 January 1927.

Two floors were added to the structure in 1956 due to a demand for more space.

The Parliament Museum, opened in 2006, stands next to the Parliament House in the building of the Parliamentary Library.

Description 
The perimeter of the building is circular, with 144 columns on the outside. At the centre of the building is the circular Central Chamber, and surrounding this Chamber are three semicircular halls that were constructed for the sessions of the Chamber of Princes (now used as the Library Hall), the State Council (now used for the Rajya Sabha), and the Central Legislative Assembly (now used for the Lok Sabha). The parliament is surrounded by large gardens and the perimeter is fenced off by sandstone railings (jali).
The current building is planned to be converted into a Museum of Democracy after the new Parliament House is operational.

Parliament House (New)

Background 
Proposals for a new parliament building to replace Parliament House emerged in the early 2010s as a result of questions being asked about the stability of the original structure. In 2012, a committee was assembled by the then-Speaker, Mira Kumar, to suggest and assess several alternatives to the usage of the building.

Commencement 
In 2019, the Indian government launched the Central Vista Redevelopment Project, a multi-billion dollar project to redevelop the Central Vista, India's central administrative area near Raisina Hill, New Delhi. The construction of a new parliament building, as well as redeveloping the Rajpath will create a new office and residence for the Indian prime minister, as well as combining all ministerial buildings in a single central secretariat.

The groundbreaking ceremony for the new building was held in October 2020 and the foundation stone was laid on 10 December 2020.

Incidents

2001 terror attack

The 2001 Indian Parliament attack was a terrorist attack on the Parliament of India in New Delhi, India on 13 December 2001. The perpetrators belonged to Lashkar-e-Taiba (LeT) and Jaish-e-Mohammed (JeM) - two Pakistan-raised terrorist organisations.[1][3] The attack led to the deaths of six Delhi Police personnel, two Parliament Security Service personnel, and a gardener – in total 9 – and led to increased tensions between India and Pakistan, resulting in the 2001–02 India–Pakistan standoff. The 5 terrorists were killed outside the parliament.

Gallery

See also 
 List of political parties in India

References

External links 
 

Parliament of India
Government buildings in Delhi
Herbert Baker buildings and structures